is a private junior college in Beppu, Ōita, Japan, established in 1986. The predecessor of the school was founded in 1964.

External links
 Official website 

Educational institutions established in 1964
Private universities and colleges in Japan
Universities and colleges in Ōita Prefecture
Japanese junior colleges
Beppu, Ōita
1964 establishments in Japan